Lu Wen (born February 26, 1990) is a Chinese basketball player for Bayi Kylin and the Chinese national team, where she participated at the 2014 FIBA World Championship.

References

External links

1990 births
Living people
Chinese women's basketball players
Small forwards
Basketball players at the 2016 Summer Olympics
Olympic basketball players of China
Basketball players from Inner Mongolia
People from Ordos City
Chinese people of Mongolian descent
Bayi Kylin players